Motorhead: High Velocity Entertainment is a racing video game developed by Digital Illusions CE AB for PlayStation and Microsoft Windows.

Gameplay
Motorhead is a futuristic racing video game. It features eight circuits and ten cars for players to select from.

Reception

The PC version received above-average reviews, while the PlayStation version received mixed reviews, according to the review aggregation website GameRankings. Edge described the latter version as "something of an enigma, existing somewhere between Wipeout and Ridge Racer." The magazine praised its distinctive setting and addictive gameplay, but criticized its difficulty and short number of tracks. Chris Gregson of GameSpot said of the PC version, "If you like pure speed seasoned with good graphics, this is one you definitely don't want to miss." PC Accelerator gave the European import a mixed review, while PC Gamer gave it a favourable review, many months before it was released Stateside.

Notes

References

External links
 
 

1998 video games
Digital Illusions CE games
Fox Interactive games
Science fiction racing games
Gremlin Interactive games
PlayStation (console) games
Racing video games
Video games developed in Sweden
Video games scored by Olof Gustafsson
Windows games
Multiplayer and single-player video games